Nenad Lukić (14 December 1968 – 10 February 2014) was a Serbian footballer who played as a goalkeeper.

Club career
After spending two seasons with Napredak Kruševac, Lukić became best known for his spell at Obilić and was the team's starting goalkeeper (appearing in 32 of 33 games) in the title-winning 1997–98 season. He subsequently set the league record for the longest time without conceding a goal (over 900 minutes) during the NATO bombing-suspended 1998–99 season. Later on, Lukić played for Bulgarian club CSKA Sofia on two occasions.

International career
In March 1999, Lukić received his first call-up to the FR Yugoslavia national team by manager Milan Živadinović, but remained uncapped.

Death
Lukić died on 10 February 2014 at the age of 45 after a long illness.

Honours
Obilić
 First League of FR Yugoslavia: 1997–98

References

External links
 
 

1968 births
2014 deaths
Sportspeople from Leskovac
Yugoslav footballers
Serbia and Montenegro footballers
Serbian footballers
Association football goalkeepers
FK Dubočica players
FK Napredak Kruševac players
FK Obilić players
PFC CSKA Sofia players
FK Sutjeska Nikšić players
FK Smederevo players
PFC Spartak Varna players
Second League of Serbia and Montenegro players
First League of Serbia and Montenegro players
Serbia and Montenegro expatriate footballers
Expatriate footballers in Bulgaria
Serbia and Montenegro expatriate sportspeople in Bulgaria